The Confederate Medal of Honor is a posthumous award created by the Sons of Confederate Veterans (SCV) in 1977 to recognize Confederate veterans who "distinguished themselves conspicuously by gallantry, bravery, and intrepidity at the risk of life, above and beyond the call of duty" during the American Civil War.

Background 

During the American Civil War, the Confederate States Congress authorized President Jefferson Davis to "bestow medals, with proper devices, upon such officers of the armies of the Confederate States as shall be conspicuous for courage and good conduct on the field of battle, and also to confer a badge of distinction upon one private or non-commissioned officer of each company after every signal victory it shall have assisted to achieve." Lacking adequate manufacturing capability, Adjutant and Inspector General Samuel Cooper belatedly established the "Roll of Honor" on October 3, 1863, in Richmond, Virginia.

History 
In 1968, the Sons of Confederate Veterans passed a resolution to issue a "medal of honor" and began minting them in 1977. According to past executive director Ben Sewell, "[t]he SCV created their own Confederate Medal of Honor simply because there were some incredible acts of valor that had received little or no recognition during and after the war". As of 2014, at least 50 medals had been awarded.

Design 
The Confederate Medal of Honor is bronze and silver, with two five-pointed stars overlain. Inscribed are the words "Honor. Duty. Valor. Devotion." In the center is the Great Seal of the Confederate States.

Criteria 
Recipients must be shown to have "distinguished themselves conspicuously by gallantry, bravery, and intrepidity at the risk of life, above and beyond the call of duty, while engaged in action against the enemy of the Confederate States of America." Most recommendations are derived from the Confederate Roll of Honor. Medals are provided to museums and libraries under a condition they properly display them.

Notable recipients  

 Father Emmeran M. Bliemel
 Commander Isaac Brown
 Private Sam Davis
 David Owen Dodd
 Major Richard W. Dowling
 Lieutenant-General Nathan Bedford Forrest
 Brigadier-General Wade Hampton
 Sergeant Richard Rowland Kirkland
 Captain John S. Mosby
 Major John Pelham
 Captain Henry Wirz

See also 
 Lists of awards

References

Further reading

External links 

 Confederate Medal of Honor at Portland Press Herald
 Confederate Medal of Honor at the Wayback Machine
 Confederate Medal of Honor Committee at Sons of Confederate Veterans

1977 establishments in the United States
Awards established in 1977
Lost Cause of the Confederacy
Posthumous recognitions
Sons of Confederate Veterans
Military awards and decorations of the American Civil War